Panther Hollow Lake is a human-made lake in Schenley Park in Pittsburgh, Pennsylvania.

Watershed 
The lake serves as a catch basin for the  Panther Hollow Watershed, which includes sections of Schenley Park and Squirrel Hill. It receives storm drain from the watershed, which it sends to the Monongahela River via the Four Mile Run. Two streams, Phipps Run and Panther Hollow Run, flow through Schenley Park, feeding the lake.

History

Before the park 
Before Schenley Park was built and Squirrel Hill was heavily settled, there were several tributaries throughout the park and Squirrel Hill which comprised a part of the watershed. Today, the streams in Squirrel Hill are buried, and feed the city sewer system instead of the lake.

Construction 
The lake was originally constructed in 1892 as part of the early development of Schenley Park. The lake was a popular gathering place which was used for rowing in summer and ice skating in winter. Around the same time, Schenley Park was undergoing a new round of improvements such as the construction of Schenley Oval and the Tufa Bridges. In 1909, the lake was expanded and rebuilt with a concrete lining and a new boathouse was added.

Decline and 1st Renovation 
Over the years, sediment and silt built up in the lake, raising the bottom of the lake-bed significantly. A major renovation was ordered in 1957 by then‑mayor David L. Lawrence, in which the lake was drained completely, the walls of the lake re-constructed, and the lake re-filled with small shrubs. However, after a 2-year period of shrubs, water was returned into the lake.

Popular Activities 
Originally, there was a boathouse located on the lake, which provided patrons with a pastime. Ice skating was also popular on the lake up until the 70's.

2nd Decline and 2nd Renovation  
After many years of neglect, the boathouse was demolished in 1979, and the lake gradually fell out of use with the general public. Currently, the Pittsburgh Parks Conservancy has adopted a plan to bring the lake back to its original splendor; including a full restoration of the lake, a rehabilitation of the watershed, and a reconstruction of the boathouse.

External links

 Panther Hollow Watershed at Pittsburgh Parks Conservancy

References

Reservoirs in Pennsylvania
Schenley Park
Bodies of water of Allegheny County, Pennsylvania